The Institute of Molecular Biology (IMB) is a modern research centre on the campus of the Johannes Gutenberg University in Mainz, Germany. It is funded by the Boehringer Ingelheim Foundation and the state of Rheinland Palatinate. The scientists at IMB primarily conduct basic science in developmental biology, epigenetics, ageing, genome stability and related areas.

History  
 In early 2009 the Boehringer Ingelheim Foundation decided to fund a new centre of excellence in the life sciences.
 The federal state of Rhineland-Palatinate financed the construction of a new building, starting in December 2009 on the campus of the University of Mainz.
 In May 2010 developmental biologist Christof Niehrs (formerly at the German Cancer Research Center, DKFZ) was appointed as the institute's founding director. The institute was then named "Institute of Molecular Biology" and the institute's research focus on developmental biology, epigenetics, and DNA repair was set.
 The major part of the IMB building was inaugurated in March 2011.
 In July 2011, the first five research groups started their work at IMB, with four more groups following in 2012.
 From 2013-2015, eight research groups joined IMB.
 From 2018-2021, six groups joined IMB.
 The continuation of core funding was secured from autumn 2020 – 2027 by the Boehringer Ingelheim Foundation and the State of Rhineland-Palatinate.

Research 
IMB’s mission is to answer key questions in how organisms grow, age, and develop disease through basic research in epigenetics, genome stability and related fields.

Research in these fields is carried out in the following research groups, led by one group leader each:

 Joan Barau: Transposable Elements & Genome Stability
 Peter Baumann: Chromosome Dynamics, Telomeres & Ageing
 Petra Beli: Chromatin Biology & Proteomics
 Falk Butter: Quantitative Proteomics
 Dorothee Dormann: RNA-Binding Proteins in Neurodegeneration
 Claudia Keller Valsecchi: Biology of Gene Dosage Alterations
 René Ketting: Biology of Non-Coding RNA
 Anton Khmelinksii: Proteome Organisation & Dynamics
 Julian König: Genomic Views of the RNA World
 Nard Kubben: Biology of Ageing and Ageing-Related Diseases
 Edward Lemke: Synthetic Biophysics of Protein Disorder
 Katja Luck: Integrative Systems Biology
 Brian Luke: Telomere Biology
 Christof Niehrs: DNA Demethylation & Reprogramming
 Jan Padeken: Heterochromatin & Genome Stability
 Vassilis Roukos: Cell Biology of Genome Maintenance
 Sandra Schick: Chromatin Regulation
 Lukas Stelzl: Gene Regulation by Liquid-Liquid Phase Separation
 Helle Ulrich: Maintenance of Genome Stability
 Eva Wolf: Structural Chronobiology

Joint Research Initiatives 
IMB coordinates a number of joint research initiatives with institutions in Mainz (Johannes Gutenberg University, the University Medical Centre, and the Max Planck Institute for Polymer Research) and beyond.  

Current joint Research Initiatives:

 The SFB 1361 on "Regulation of DNA Repair and Genome Stability" funded by the DFG
 The “Centre for Healthy Ageing” (CHA), a virtual research centre that brings together researchers in DNA repair, telomere biology, epigenetics, resilience, immunology and clinical specialties in the context of ageing
 The “Resilience, Adaption and Longevity” (ReALity), a joint initiative of all Principle investigators of the Faculty of Biology, the Focus Program Translational Neurosciences (FTN), the Research Center for Immunotherapy (FZI), and the Center for Translational Vascular Biology (CTVB) at Johannes Gutenberg University Mainz
 The “Science of Healthy Ageing Research Programme” (SHARP), a joint PhD programme between IMB, Johannes Gutenberg University, and the University Medical Center Mainz (UMC).
 The GenEvo Research Training Group on "Gene Regulation in Evolution"
 IMB's International PhD Programme (IPP)
 IMB's International Summer School (ISS), an annual six-week research experience for students
 IMB’s Postdoc Programme (IPPro)

In addition, IMB runs an Advanced Training Programme with short courses in soft skills.

International PhD Programme (IPP)  
The International PhD Program is coordinated by the Institute for Molecular Biology. The participating groups are located at the following institutions:

 Institute of Molecular Biology (IMB) 
 Johannes Gutenberg University (JGU) 
 University Medical Centre (UMC)

The research groups in the IPP cover a broad range of expertise in ageing & disease, DNA repair & genome stability, epigenetics & nuclear dynamics, bioinformatics & computational biology, RNA biology, and gene regulation & evolution.

Core funding for the IPP comes from the three main participating institutions of IMB, JGU, and UMC.

International Summer School  
The International Summer School (ISS) is a 6-week programme with a focus on “Gene Regulation, Epigenetics and Genome Stability”. The ISS offers outstanding and enthusiastic undergraduate and Master's students from all over the world the opportunity to acquire excellent practical skills and hands-on training from leading scientists in molecular biology.

Postdoc Programme 
The IMB Postdoc Programme (IPPro) was established specifically to provide IMBs postdocs with the necessary scientific & technical support and tailored mentoring to fast-track their careers, including scientific seminars, courses & events, technical training, professional skills training, mentoring, and career development.

Scientific Advisory Board (SAB) 
Current members of the SAB:

 Prof. Peter Becker (Biomedical Center Munich, Ludwig Maximillian University)
 Prof. Bradley Cairns (Huntsman Cancer Institute, University of Utah)
 Prof. Malene Hansen (Buck Institute for Research on Aging)
 Prof. Ian Hickson (Center for Chromosome Stability and Center for Healthy Aging, University of Copenhagen)
 Prof. Rudolf Jaenisch (The Whitehead Institute for Biomedical Research)
 Prof. Ruth Lehmann (The Whitehead Institute for Biomedical Research)
 Prof. Marina Rodnina (Max Planck Institute for Biophysical Chemistry, Göttingen)

Infrastructure 
IMB is housed in a new 6000 sq m research building with laboratories, offices, seminar rooms and a large auditorium. IMB is located in close proximity to many institutes of the Johannes Gutenberg University of Mainz, two Max Planck Institutes, the University of Applied Sciences Mainz, and the University Medical Center. Nearby Frankfurt and Darmstadt are also cities with extensive scientific activities, including the research of Goethe University Frankfurt, and the Technical University of Darmstadt.

People related to the institute 

 Christof Niehrs, Leibniz Prize awardee, founding director of IMB.
 Rudolf Jaenisch, pioneer in the field of transgenetic research, member of the Scientific Advisory Board.
 Ernst Ludwig Winnacker, renowned biochemist and research manager, previous member of the Scientific Advisory Board.
 Peter Baumann, Holder of the Humboldt Professorship and Adjunct Director at IMB, was elected to the European Molecular Biology Organization in 2019
 Christoph Cremer, German physicist, emeritus at the Ruprecht-Karls-University Heidelberg, honorary professor at the University of Mainz and emeritus Group Leader at IMB

References 

 New international PhD programme in the Life Sciences, German Embassy, New Delhi, 02.01.2012.
 IMB - a new center for life science research, EMBO encounters, Winter 2011/2012, p. 14.
 Petra Giegerich: Festive opening of the Institute of Molecular Biology at Johannes Gutenberg University Mainz, innovations report, 16.03.2011.

External links  
 
 The Boehringer Ingelheim Foundation

Medical research institutes in Germany
Molecular biology institutes
Research institutes established in 2010
Medical and health organisations based in Rhineland-Palatinate
2010 establishments in Germany